Cadlina umiushi is a species of sea snail, a marine gastropod mollusk, in the family Cadlinidae.

References

umiushi
Gastropods described in 2015